Publius Furius Medullinus Fusus (died 464 BC) was a Roman politician during the 5th century BC, and was consul in 472 BC.

Family
He was a member of the gens Furia, and was the brother of Spurius Furius Medullinus Fusus (consul 464 BC).

Biography

Consulship
In 472 BC he was elected consul with Lucius Pinarius Mamercinus Rufus. During their consulship, tribune of the plebs Volero Publilius proposed a law (Rogato Publilia) that plebeian tribunes should be elected by the Tribal Assembly; Volero Pubilius proposed this new system so that patricians and their clients would be excluded from the voting, and thus they would lose their influence on such decisions.

During his consulship a Vestal named either Orbinia or Sunia was put to death for the crime of incestum (sexual misconduct). The Vestals were expected to remain virgins; if a woman had lost her virginity, it was sacrilege for her to tend the sacred hearth of Vesta.

According to Varro, the "Lex Pinaria Furia of the intercalary month" is ascribed to Furius and Pinarius. It mentions the method by which the dispenser of days could add additional days to the calendar, based on the lunar cycle.

Late career
In 467 BC, after taking the Volscian maritime city of Antium the preceding year, the Romans had founded a colony there. Furius was appointed one of three commissioners (Triumviri agro dando) together with Titus Quinctius Capitolinus Barbatus and Aulus Verginius Tricostus Caeliomontanus. They were charged with dividing and distributing the lands of the colony among the first colonists.

In 464 BC, he was given command as a legatus under his brother Spurius Furius Medullinus Fusus, then consul, in a war against the Aequi. The Romans were trapped in their camp.  During a sortie Publius led his troops too far from the main Roman force, and was cut off and killed.  Spurius sought to help his brother, but was wounded in the attempt.  Publius' head was later displayed by the Aequi on a spear.

References

Modern sources

Ancient sources

Bibliography

Ancient authors
 Dionysius of Halicarnassus in Romaike Archaiologia book 9
 Titus Livius in Roman History book 2.

Modern authors
 
 

464 BC deaths
Year of birth unknown
5th-century BC Roman consuls
Medullinus, Publius
Ancient Romans killed in action